Thomas Spring may refer to:

Thomas Spring of Lavenham (c. 1474–1523), English merchant
Thomas Spring of Castlemaine (died 1597), English soldier
Sir Thomas Spring, 3rd Baronet (c. 1672–1704), English baronet
Tom Spring (1795–1851), bare-knuckle fighter
Thomas J. Spring (1904–?), American judge

See also
Thomas Spring Rice (disambiguation)